"James Dean" is a song written by Don Henley, Glenn Frey, Jackson Browne, and J. D. Souther, and recorded by the American rock band Eagles for their 1974 album On the Border. It was the second single released from this album, reaching number 77 on the U.S. pop singles chart.

The song is about American actor James Dean (1931–1955) who starred in such films as Rebel Without a Cause, Giant and East of Eden. The lyrics, "too fast to live, too young to die" refer to the life and abrupt death of Dean in a car crash in 1955. Bernie Leadon played the guitar solo.

Background
"James Dean" was first written as for an album originally intended to have a theme on anti-heroes.  According to Glenn Frey, he together with Don Henley, Jackson Browne, and J. D. Souther were jamming together after attending a Tim Hardin show at the Troubadour in 1972, and they came up the idea about doing an album about anti-heroes.  From this came the songs "Doolin-Dalton" and "James Dean".  The album however evolved into a wild-west themed album Desperado which was released in 1973, and "James Dean" was shelved. When recording began for On the Border, the song was immediately pulled off the shelf and completed. The song was written mostly by Jackson Browne according to Henley.

The B-side "Good Day in Hell" is notable for being the first Eagles track recorded with Don Felder, who joined the band midway through the sessions for the album.

Reception
Billboard described "James Dean" as "good solid rocker" with "fine vocal harmonies" whose instrumentation is reminiscent of Jackson Browne's 1973 song "Redneck Friend," on which Eagles guitarist Glenn Frey provided backup vocals.  Cash Box said that this is "one of the best rockers to come around in years" and said that "lyrically, the tribute to the legendary film star is letter perfect" and that "musically, well, just try to keep from dancing here."  Record World said that the "legendary screen idol of the '50s still stands tall as a rebellious figure, worthy of the contemporary missive that these men definitely deliver with all due cause, speed and prowess." Ultimate Classic Rock critic Sterling Whitaker rated it as the Eagles 8th most underrated song.

Personnel
 Glenn Frey – lead vocals, rhythm guitar 
 Don Henley – drums, background vocals
 Bernie Leadon – lead guitar , background vocals
 Randy Meisner – bass, background vocals

Charts

External links

References

1974 singles
Eagles (band) songs
Jackson Browne songs
Songs written by Jackson Browne
Songs written by Glenn Frey
Songs written by Don Henley
Songs written by J. D. Souther
Song recordings produced by Glyn Johns
Asylum Records singles
Song recordings produced by Bill Szymczyk
1974 songs
Songs about actors
Cultural depictions of James Dean